¿Dónde está Elisa? (English: Where is Elisa?) is a Spanish-language telenovela, written by Pablo Illanes, produced by TVN (Chile) and remade by the U.S. television network Telemundo and RCN Colombia. It is based on the Chilean telenovela of the same name produced by TVN in 2009.

Telemundo began airing ¿Dónde Está Elisa? on March 8, 2010 airing weeknights at 10pm/9c over about 26 weeks during the 2010 season. As with most of its other telenovelas, the network broadcasts English subtitles as closed captions on CC3.

The first sneak peek of the production was shown on Tuesday on January 13, 2010. The series was produced in Miami, Florida. The filming started on January 27 and ended in May 2010. On July 26, the series shared the 1 hour time slot with another Telemundo telenovela La Diosa Coronada. The last episode of the series was aired on Tuesday on August 10, 2010.

A question is how much of DEE is based on the successful book The Girl with the Dragon Tattoo (also known as Men Who Hate Women in English), a 2009 Swedish film adaptation of the novel Män som hatar kvinnor by the late Swedish author/journalist Stieg Larsson. DEE was written or adapted by Pablo Illanes, who wrote the Chilean version that preceded that of Telemundo. Illanes says that the inspiration of the story comes from the book and the real life drama of British native Madeleine McCann in Portugal. The list of suspects is long, and it includes family members, fellow students, and friends of the teenager who went to the same places that she used to go to before disappearing. There is a striking similarity between DEE and the previously aired Desaparecida, a limited serial drama television series from Spain.

Plot 
The lives of the Altamira family are changed forever. Their lives are engulfed by the events in the disappearance of Elisa (Vanessa Pose), the oldest daughter of Mariano Altamira (Gabriel Porras) and Dana Riggs Altamira (Sonya Smith).

Once she disappears, we begin to learn the secrets of every member of the family and friends; the paranoias start, histories from the past, themes that were supposed to be buried. Then the recriminations among family members start.

In the midst of family conflicts many suspects come to light, among them family members (Elisa's parents, uncles, cousins) fellow students, former and present Altamira employees, as well as friends that used to go to the same places that Elisa would frequent. Eventually, Bruno Cáceres (Roberto Mateos) will emerge as the kidnapper....

Despite the continual efforts to find Elisa, a more prominent theme is the disintegration of the Altamira clan. In the initial episode they look like a one big happy clan, but there are many problems beneath that surface which come to light. A major theme of the story is the consequences of hypocrisy.

Cast 
 Main Cast In Order of Appearance 

 Special Participation 

Secondary Cast

United States broadcast 
 Release dates, episode name & length, and U.S. viewers based on Telemundo's broadcast.

References

External links 
 Seriesnow

2010 telenovelas
2010 American television series debuts
2010 American television series endings
American television series based on telenovelas
Spanish-language American telenovelas
Telemundo telenovelas
American television series based on Chilean television series
Television series about missing people